Principina may refer to a pair of Italian villages in Tuscany, frazioni of Grosseto:

Principina a Mare, by the sea
Principina Terra, between the coast and Grosseto